Repetto is a surname. Notable people with the name include:
 Amelia Repetto, Uruguayan composer
 Andrea Repetto (born 1969), Chilean economist
 Carlos Torre Repetto (1904-1978), chess grandmaster from Mexico
 Francesco Repetto (1914–1984), Italian priest and librarian, Righteous Among the Nations
 Maria Repetto (1807-1890), Italian Roman Catholic professed religious
 Nicolás Repetto (1871-1965), Argentine physician and leader of the Socialist Party of Argentina
 Nicolás Repetto (TV host) (born 1957), Argentine TV host
 Pablo Repetto (born 1974), Uruguayan football manager
 Rose Repetto (1907–1984), Italian-born French business owner, founder of the Repetto ballet shoe company

See also
 Repetto, a French shoe company
 Carlos Torre Repetto Memorial, an annual chess tournament in Mexico
 Repetto Formation, a Pliocene epoch sedimentary unit in the greater Los Angeles Basin